Wiscombe Park Hillclimb is a British hillclimb, situated in Colyton, Devon. The course, which is 1000 yards (914 metres) in length — the same as Shelsley Walsh — was opened in 1958.  The course was extended in 1961 when the record was held by Addicott in a Lotus at 49.3 secs. Wiscombe  has been hosting rounds of the British Hill Climb Championship since the May meeting in 1962.

The outright hill record currently stands at 32.94 seconds, set by Alex Summers in July 2022.

Wiscombe Park Hill Climb past winners

Key: R = Course Record; S/C = Supercharged.

Footnotes

External links
 Wiscombe Park Hillclimb

Hillclimbs
Auto races in the United Kingdom